A jet trainer is a jet aircraft for use as a trainer, whether for basic or advanced flight training. Jet trainers are either custom designs or modifications of existing aircraft. With the introduction of military jet-powered aircraft towards the end of the World War II it became a requirement to train pilots in the handling of such aircraft.

History
The first generation of trainers in the 1940s were modified from existing designs like the Gloster Meteor and Lockheed T-33 but with these were followed by custom training aircraft like the Aero L-29 Delfín and the BAC Jet Provost.

As training developed different air forces used jet trainers for different phases of training. Although most air forces continued to use piston or later turboprop aircraft for basic training, a number of jet trainers like the Cessna T-37 Tweet appeared for the early stages of pilot training. Pilots who were picked to fly fighter or strike aircraft then went on to fly more advanced training aircraft like the Hawker Siddeley Gnat.

As the early jet-trainers became obsolete then further generations have appeared, the British using the single-engine BAE Systems Hawk while the French ordered the Dassault/Dornier Alpha Jet. In the Warsaw Pact the Aero L-39 Albatros became the standard jet trainer.

As the jet trainer developed it was also used for weapon training, which led to some trainers being modified as light strike aircraft; for example, the Cessna T-37 Tweet was developed into the Cessna A-37 Dragonfly.

Modern jet trainers are structurally strengthened in order to allow high stress maneuvers and aerobatics.

List of jet trainers
Below is a list of some current and former jet trainers

References

Aircraft by type
Trainer aircraft